
The Chicago 1885 cholera epidemic myth is a persistent urban legend, stating that 90,000 people in Chicago died of typhoid fever and cholera in 1885. Although the story is widely reported, these deaths did not occur. 

Lake Michigan was the source of Chicago's drinking water. During a tremendous storm in 1885, the rainfall washed refuse from the Chicago River far out into the lake. Citizens feared that sewage run-off from the storm would reach the intake cribs of the Chicago lake tunnels (built in 1866 and 1874) and pollute the city’s drinking water.

According to the legend, typhoid, cholera and other waterborne diseases from the contaminated drinking water killed up to 90,000 people. The Chicago Sanitary District (now The Metropolitan Water Reclamation District) was said to have been created by the Illinois legislature in 1889 in response to a terrible epidemic which killed thousands of residents of this fledgling city.

However, analysis of the deaths in Chicago shows no deaths from cholera and only a slight rise in typhoid deaths. In fact, no cholera outbreaks had occurred in Chicago since the 1860s. Typhoid deaths never exceeded 1,000 in any year in the 1880s. The supposed 90,000 deaths would have represented 12% of the city's entire population and would have left numerous public records as well as newspaper accounts. Libby Hill, researching her book The Chicago River: A Natural and Unnatural History, found no newspaper or mortality records and, at her prompting, the Chicago Tribune issued a retraction (on September 29, 2005) of the three recent instances where they had mentioned the epidemic.

Actual deaths 
An outbreak of cholera in 1849 killed 678 persons, 2.9 percent of the city's population, and an 1854 outbreak killed 1,424 people. Another cholera epidemic hit the city in 1866 and 1867. In the late 19th century, typhoid fever mortality rate in Chicago averaged 65 per 100,000 people a year. The worst year was 1891, when the typhoid death rate was 174 per 100,000 persons.

References

External links

Sources repeating myth 
 "History of Lake Michigan Diversion" PDF—In the 1885 epidemic, 90,000 people were killed.
 "History of the Chicago Diversion and Future Implications", Journal of Great Lakes Research, Volume 22, Issue 1, 1996, Pages 100-118.
 Reversal of the Chicago River, The Traveling Cableway and Some Other Devices Employed by Contractors on the Chicago Main Drainage Canal. New York: Lidgerwood Manufacturing Co., 1895. —...and killing almost 12 percent of the population with cholera and other diseases.
 HISTORY OF SELECTED PUBLIC HEALTH EVENTS IN CHICAGO, 1834–1999 —...epidemic kills 90,000 Chicagoans...
 Cartoon showing effect of Cholera in Chicago in 1885 —Over 80,000 people died. (Update)
 The Ghost Map: The Story of London's Most Terrifying Epidemic—and How It Changed Science, Cities, and the Modern World] (2006) by Steven Johnson. —Cholera would continue to terrorize Western cities .... One such outbreak hit Chicago in 1885 .... Ten percent of the city's population died...
 The Devil in the White City (2003) by Erik Larson. Claims ten per cent mortality.

Rebuttal 
 Did 90,000 people die of typhoid fever and cholera in Chicago in 1885?
 Chicago Tribune Retraction Tribune archives and public health records do not note such an occurrence, and the number of purported deaths—80,000 to 90,000—would have been far too many not to have been noted.
 Review of Hill's book

1885 in Illinois
1885 in the United States
Cholera outbreaks
19th-century epidemics
History of Chicago
Pseudohistory
Typhoid fever
Urban legends